Ichthyodes jackmani is a species of beetle in the family Cerambycidae. It was described by Hüdepohl in 1989.

References

Ichthyodes
Beetles described in 1989